XHQAA-FM is a radio station on 99.3 FM in Chetumal, Quintana Roo, Mexico, carrying the La Bestia Grupera grupera format.

History
XEQAA-AM 560 received its concession in October 1994. While it was owned by Radiorama since it signed on, operation of the station in recent years has shifted to Luna Medios, a local operator.

XEQAA migrated to FM in 2012 on 99.3 MHz.

References

Spanish-language radio stations
Radio stations in Quintana Roo
Chetumal